Unbelievable is the third studio album from R&B artist Keke Wyatt. It came out a year after her previous studio release, Who Knew?, on June 14, 2011 through Shanachie Records. It peaked at No. 48 on the R&B Albums chart.

Singles
Among other covers, Unbelievable includes the track "Saturday Love", which features Ruben Studdard and is the only single, which was released on May 24, 2011. It's the original cover of "Saturday Love" by Cherrelle and Alexander O'Neal.

Track listing

Charts

References

2011 albums
Keke Wyatt albums
Shanachie Records albums